David Ferguson (1949–2019) was a Distinguished Service Professor and Provost's Scholar at Stony Brook University.

He joined Stony Brook University in 1981, becoming first African-American assistant professor there.

From 1998 to 2002, Ferguson served as the founding director of Stony Brook's Center for Excellence in Learning and Teaching. From 2002 to 2017, he served as the chair of Department of Technology and Society, College of Engineering and Applied Sciences.

For his contribution to STEM education, he received the U.S. Presidential Award for Excellence in Science, Mathematics, and Engineering Mentoring, jointly administered by the White House and NSF, in 1997.

References 

1949 births
2019 deaths
African-American educators
Stony Brook University faculty
20th-century African-American people
21st-century African-American people